Idrissou Tamimou (born 1961) is a Beninese middle-distance runner. He competed in the men's 800 metres at the 1992 Summer Olympics.

References

1961 births
Living people
Athletes (track and field) at the 1992 Summer Olympics
Beninese male middle-distance runners
Olympic athletes of Benin
Place of birth missing (living people)